Boșcana is a commune in Criuleni District, Moldova. It is composed of two villages, Boșcana and Mărdăreuca.

References

Communes of Criuleni District